Katy, Katie or Kate Green may refer to:

Katy Green (rugby union) (born 1985), Scottish rugby union player
Katy Green (figure skater), American ice dancer in 1999 U.S. Junior Figure Skating Championships
Katie Green (born 1987), British model
Katie Green (rugby league), Australian rugby league player
Kate Green (born 1960), British politician
Kate Green (producer), Canadian film producer

See also
Katie Hall (American politician) (born Katie Beatrice Green, 1938–2012), American politician
Katherine Green (disambiguation)
Catherine Green (disambiguation)